Leonid Vitalyevich Sobinov (7 June [OS 26 May] 1872 – 14 October 1934) was an Imperial Russian operatic tenor. His fame continued unabated into the Soviet era, and he was made a People's Artist of the RSFSR in 1923. Sobinov's voice was lyrical in size and tone, and it was employed with discerning taste and excellent musicianship.

Biography

Leonid Sobinov was born in Yaroslavl, into the family of the lower middle-class trade officer Vitaly Vasilyevich Sobinov. The period of his childhood was apparently happy and calm. Sobinov's mother, who died early, was a keen singer, and due to her inspiration, he began singing himself. In 1881, at the age of nine, he entered a boys' school, graduating in 1890 with a silver medal. As a schoolboy, he had played the guitar as well as joining a local choir.

Sobinov enrolled in a university course in Moscow. This led to a degree in law, which he received in 1894. After university, Sobinov performed military service and then began to practice law. He also studied singing in Moscow with professors Alexander Dodonov and Alexandra Santagano Gorchakova, who, in 1897, suggested that he attend an audition at the city's Bolshoi Theatre. He did well at the audition, obtaining a Bolshoi contract for an initial period of two years. This contract would lay the foundation for a subsequent singing career of extraordinary success.

Sobinov would go on to appear in Moscow and Saint Petersburg in operas such as Ruslan and Ludmila, Faust, Manon, Prince Igor, Eugene Onegin, Halka, Rigoletto, Lohengrin, Tannhäuser (as Walter von der Vogelweide) and Mikhail Ivanov's Zabava Putyatishna (as Solovey Budimirovich).

Sobinov was impressed by the up-and-coming operatic bass Feodor Chaliapin, who was one year younger than he was, and they appeared together on stage in 1899. In that same year, he added the parts of Andrei (Mazeppa), Gérald (Lakmé) and Alfredo Germont (La traviata) to his repertoire. After going through the score of Carmen, he declined to take on the role of Don José, insisting that its dramatic nature would be too taxing for his voice.

The reigning lyric tenor at the Bolshoi during the 1890s and early 1900s was Nikolay Figner. Figner was a close friend of Russia's leading composer, Pyotr Ilyich Tchaikovsky; but Sobinov proved to be the older tenor's equal or superior in every way, surpassing him even as Lensky in Tchaikovsky's Eugene Onegin.

In order to enlarge his operatic repertoire (having already added to it the tenor leads in Martha, Werther, Mignon and Roméo et Juliette), Sobinov decided to travel to Italy, so that he could experience Italian opera directly. In 1904-06 (and again in 1911) he appeared at Italy's premier opera house, La Scala, Milan. His performances were acclaimed not only in Russia but also in other European countries, owing to the beauty of his voice and the polish of his singing style. As well as the Bolshoi and La Scala, he sang at the Mariinsky Theatre, Saint Petersburg; Palais Garnier, Paris; Royal Opera House, Covent Garden, London; Opéra de Monte-Carlo, Monte Carlo; and Teatro Real, Madrid.

Sobinov achieved enormous fame despite facing strong competition for the Russian public's affection from a number of rival male singers of outstanding quality. They included his fellow lyric tenors Dmitri Smirnov and Andrey Labinsky, the spinto tenor Lev Klementiev and the dramatic tenor Ivan Yershov. According to his contemporaries, Leonid Sobinov was a person blessed with rare charm. Famous beauties of his era were constantly falling in love with him. They included, among many others, the actress Elisabeth Sadovskaya and the ballet dancer and silent-cinema star Vera Karalli.

Although Sobinov's first marriage to Maria Karzhavina, a Philharmonic Society schoolmate, did not last, he was devoted to his two sons by her, Boris and George (Yuri) Sobinov. In 1915, he married secondly Nina Mukhina. She was the sister of the renowned Soviet sculptor Vera Mukhina, who was the creator of the "Worker and Collective Farmer" monument. It was a happy marriage. They had one daughter, Svetlana.

In 1917, after the Russian Revolution, Sobinov became the first elected director of the Bolshoi Theatre. He undertook a theatrical trip to the Ukraine in 1918 and found himself cut off temporarily from Russia. In 1919, he was assigned to the role of chairman of the musical committee of the all-Ukrainian Division of Arts in Kyiv. The year 1920 saw him become a manager at the Division of Public Education in Sevastopol. In 1920 his son Yuri, who served in the White Army, was killed near Melitopol. His other son, Boris (1895–1956), a music composer, emigrated to Germany.

Sobinov again became a director of the Bolshoi Theatre in 1921. Two years later he was selected to be a deputy of the Moscow City Council. He made his last stage appearance in 1933 at a Bolshoi gala held in his honour. The next year, he began work at the operatic studio of Konstantin Stanislavski as the studio's artistic leader.

Sobinov died in his sleep from a heart attack in Riga's Hotel Saint Petersburg on the night of 14 October 1934. His body was transported back to Moscow by special train. He was buried on October 19 at the Novo-Devichy Cemetery in Moscow.

Minor planet 4449 Sobinov is named in his honor.

Recordings: CD reissues

Sobinov left a large legacy of recordings made prior to the 1917 Revolution. Many of these have been remastered and reissued on Compact Disc by various firms. These reissues include:

The Harold Wayne Collection Vol. 36 - His First Recordings 1901-1904, Symposium
Leonid Sobinov - Recordings 1910 – 1911, Symposium
Leonid Sobinov - The HMV Catalogue Recordings, Pearl
Rimsky-Korsakov performed by his Contemporaries, Russian Disc
Singers of Russia 1900 - 1917 / Sergej Levik and Contemporaries, Symposium
Singers of Imperial Russia Vol. 1, Pearl
La Scala Edition Vol. 1, EMI
Greatest Voices of the Bolshoi, Melodiya
The 30 Tenors, Symposium
The Voices of the Tsar Vol. 1 (1901–1915), Minerva, as well as
Mike Richter's Opera Page: The Record of Singing Vol. 1 CD-ROM.

References

External links

Memorial House-Museum of Leonid V. Sobinov: info and photos (Russian, German and English)
Memorial House-Museum (only English)
Biography
 History of the Tenor / Leonid Sobinov / Sound Clips and Narration
Arias and romances for free listening and downloading
13 arias by Leonid Sobinov (free Mp3 download)

1872 births
1934 deaths
Burials at Novodevichy Cemetery
People from Yaroslavl
People's Artists of the RSFSR
Recipients of the Order of the Red Banner of Labour
Soviet tenors
Soviet male opera singers
Russian operatic tenors
20th-century Russian male opera singers